Davaji (also Romanized as Davajī) means a person who owns camels and its spelled in different forms in almost all of Turkic languages.  Davaji is a Turkmen tribe  and a common family name between Turkmens of Turkmen Sahar, Iran. Davaji is also a village in Tamran Rural District, in the Central District of Kalaleh County, Golestan Province, Iran. At the 2006 census, its population was 335, in 55 families.

References 

Populated places in Kalaleh County